Carlton Soccer Club was an Australian professional association football club based in Joimont, Melbourne. The club was formed in 1997 and joined the National Soccer League in the 1997–98 season until they were disbanded from the 2000–01 National Soccer League and became defunct. The club's first team spent four seasons in the National Soccer League. The table details the club's achievements in major competitions, and the top scorers for each season.

History
Carlton's inaugural season in 1997–98 saw the club finish regular season runners-up against South Melbourne and qualify for their first Grand Final losing 2–1 against South Melbourne with Carlton claiming the two runners-up medals. The next season in 1998–99 had the team miss out on the Finals series finishing 11th out of 15. Carlton had qualified for the Finals series the next season in 1999–2000 finished 3rd but being eliminated in the Preliminary Final by Wollongong Wolves. This was to be the club's last completed season, as the 2000–01 season saw the club become defunct after playing just eight rounds in the 2000–01 National Soccer League season and effectively forfeiting all results in the league being awarded 3–0 losses.

Key
Key to league competitions:

 National Soccer League (NSL) – Australia's former top football league, established in 1977 and dissolved in 2004.

Key to colours and symbols:

Key to league record:
 Season = The year and article of the season
 Pos = Final position
 Pld = Matches played
 W = Matches won
 D = Matches drawn
 L = Matches lost
 GF = Goals scored
 GA = Goals against
 Pts = Points

Seasons

Footnotes

References
Specific

Carlton SC